Ardencaple may refer to:

Ardencaple Castle, a lighthouse and former castle in Argyll and Bute, Scotland.
Ardencaple Farm, a settlement in Kenya's Eastern Province.